Lina Fisser was a  cargo ship that was built in 1912 by Blyth Shipbuilding and Drydock Co Ltd, Blyth as Thyra Menier for British owners. In 1918, she was sold to Belgian owners and renamed Luis Pindal. In 1925, she was sold to Italian owners and renamed Bellini. A further sale in 1928 to German owners saw her renamed Bollan and then Lina Fisser in 1936.

She was seized by the Allies in May 1945 at Kiel, Germany and passed to the Ministry of War Transport (MoWT) and renamed Empire Conderton. In 1947, she was sold into merchant service and was renamed Marchmont. In 1952, a further sale saw her renamed Irene M. In 1955, she was sold to Canada, serving until 1957 when she was scrapped.

Description
The ship was built in 1912 by Blyth Shipbuilding and Drydock Co Ltd, Blyth. She was completed in September 1912.

Her draught was approximately  She had a GRT of 1,497 and a NRT of 838,

The ship was propelled by a triple expansion steam engine, which had two cylinders of 17 inches (44 cm),  and   diameter by   stroke. The engine was built by G T Grey, South Shields.

History
Thyra Menier was built for the Donald Steamship Company, Bristol. The United Kingdom Official Number 127100 was allocated. In 1915, she was under charter to Henri Menier and had been sub-chartered to the Canadian-American Steamship Corporation, New York. The Admiralty requisitioned her, but her charterers objects, claiming that the requisition could not take place as the ship was not in British waters. At the time, the ship was in dry dock in New York.

In 1918, Thyra Menier was sold to F Lecoeuvre, Belgium and renamed Luis Pidal. She served until 1925 when she was sold to Puglisi & Tomasini, Italy and was renamed Bellini. In 1928, she was sold to August Bolten, Germany and was renamed Bollan. Her port of registry was Hamburg and the Code Letters RHCT were allocated. On 1 February 1930, Bollan departed Swansea, Wales for Sables. Whilst awaiting the tide, an explosion in her No. 1 hold blew off the hatch covers. In 1934, her code letters were changed to DHCR. In 1936, Bollan was sold to Reunert & Co GmbH. She was placed under the management of Fisser & Van Doornum, Emden and was renamed Lina Fisser.

In 1940, Germany claimed that British aircraft had attempted to bomb Lina Fisser in the North Sea. Lina Fisser was seized by the Allies in May 1945 at Kiel, passed to the MoWT and renamed Empire Conderton. Her port of registry was changed to London and the Code Letters GMWD were allocated. She regained her Official Number 127100. In 1947, she was sold to J P Hadoulis Ltd, London and renamed Marchmont. In 1952, she was sold to A Moschakis, London and renamed Irene M.  She was sold in 1955 to Tampa Shipping Ltd, Nova Scotia. Irene M was sold in 1957 to Marine Industries Ltd, Montreal. She was scrapped later that year at Sorel, Quebec.

References

1912 ships
Ships built on the River Blyth
Steamships of the United Kingdom
Merchant ships of the United Kingdom
World War I merchant ships of the United Kingdom
Steamships of Belgium
Merchant ships of Belgium
Steamships of Germany
Merchant ships of Germany
World War II merchant ships of Germany
Ministry of War Transport ships
Empire ships
Steamships of Canada
Merchant ships of Canada